David Britton (18 February 1945 – 29 December 2020) was a British author, artist, and publisher. In the 1970s he founded Weird Fantasy and Crucified Toad, a series of small press magazines of the speculative fiction and horror genres. In 1976, Britton and Michael Butterworth co-founded the publishing house Savoy Books.

Biography
Britton was a student at St John's College, Durham, graduating in 1969 with a degree in Education. In 1976, Britton founded the publisher and distributor Savoy Books with Michael Butterworth, who he had met in the early seventies. At the time, Britton was running the bookshop The House on the Borderland in Manchester.

In 1989, Britton wrote Lord Horror published by Savoy Books, a dystopian horror with a central character based on Nazi collaborator William Joyce, also known as Lord Haw-Haw. This became the last publication to be banned under the United Kingdom's Obscene Publications Act in 1992, with Britton serving a jail term at HM Prison Manchester. The ruling was later overturned on appeal after a defence led by human rights barrister Geoffrey Robertson. Copies of the book which had been seized were not returned.  A graphic novel adaptation of the book also remained banned.

Work
Britton was the creator and scriptwriter of the Lord Horror and Meng and Ecker comics published by Savoy. These characters also appear in a trio of novels written by Britton: Lord Horror, Motherfuckers: The Auschwitz of Oz, and Baptised in the Blood of Millions.

"Lord Horror," Britton said, "was so unique and radical, I expected to go to prison for it. I always thought that if you wrote a truly dangerous book -- something dangerous would happen to you. Which is one reason there are so few really dangerous books around. Publishers play at promoting dangerous books, whether they're Serpent's Tail or Penguin. All you get is a book vetted by committee, never anything radically imaginative or offensive that will take your fucking head off. Ironically, I think it would do other authors a power of good if they had to account for their books by going to prison -- there are far too many bad books being published!"

According to Michael Moorcock, Lord Horror series is the only "alternate history" to confront "Nazism with appropriate originality and passion."

Influence
Keith Seward has produced a book looking at the Lord Horror stories called Horror Panegyric which features excerpts as well as a prologue examining the tales.

Publications
 Lord Horror (1989, Savoy Books) - Butterworth edited and provided text
 Lord Horror: Reverbstorm No.12 (1996, Savoy Books) 
 Motherfuckers: The Auschwitz of Oz (1996)
 Baptised in the Blood of Millions (2001)

References

1945 births
2020 deaths
20th-century British novelists
21st-century British novelists
British alternative history writers
British comics writers
Keytarists
British male novelists
20th-century British male writers
21st-century British male writers
Alumni of St John's College, Durham
Obscenity controversies in comics
Obscenity controversies in literature
Overturned convictions in England
Prisoners and detainees of England and Wales